Amanullah Khan Niazi (14 March 1959 – 15 June 2006) was a senior jail officer (Superintendent) of Central Prison Karachi. He served in the prison department for more than 20 years. 

on 15 June 2006, Niazi was ambushed along with six of his associates in Saddar, allegedly by Ubaid Khursheed alias K2. He was killed as martyrs, because of being reluctant to facilitate inmates belonging to a political party (not let the women visiting them in jail stay beyond visiting hours), including death row inmate Saulat Mirza, Nadir Shah and Leader Saeed alias Bharam. Saeed was angry about Niazi not cooperating. As soon as he was released from jail, he started plotting against him. It was alleged that he got Niazi killed over his refusal to provide illegal facilities to Saeed Bharam and Saulat Mirza while his incarceration at Central Prison Karachi.

In 2015 Ubaid was arrested during a Rangers’ raid at Muttahida Qaumi Movement's (MQM'S) headquarters Nine Zero. During the interrogation, Ubaid claimed that he was given the task along with at least a dozen other men by MQM Leader Saeed Bharam The plan was set in motion on June 15, 2006. Amanullah Khan Niazi, his brother Inspector Habibullah khan Niazi, head constable Akhtar Hussain, police constable Sabir Sultan, and Shafiullah were killed, while several others were injured in the attack near Electronics Market.

References

Assassinated Pakistani people
1959 births
2006 deaths
Pakistani police officers
Deaths by firearm in Sindh